This list contains the names of albums that contain a hidden track and also information on how to find them. Not all printings of an album contain the same track arrangements, so some copies of a particular album may not have the hidden track(s) listed below. Some of these tracks may be hidden in the pregap, and some hidden simply as a track following the listed tracks. The list is ordered by artist name using the surname where appropriate.

 D12, Devil's Night: There is a nineteenth track not printed on the track listing called "Girls," a rap only done by Eminem which criticises Limp Bizkit and Everlast.
 DRC Music, Kinshasa One Two: An untitled hidden track about a minute after the last listed track, "Departure." This is only on the CD version which also gives a code to access three more tracks unmentioned on the album notes.
 D-A-D, Good Clean Family Entertainment You Can Trust: "Counting the Cattle" appears 8 minutes after track 14 "It's After Dark" (live)
 Da Slyme, The 20-Year Scam: "There's No Life Like It" appears as the last unlisted track on the CD but is intentionally unlisted
 Daddy Yankee, Barrio Fino: Unlisted Track 22 "Sabor a Melao" [Salsa Remix]" and Track 23 "Lo Que Pasó, Pasó" [Bachata Remix]" are found after Track 21, the "Outro"
 Dance Gavin Dance, Dance Gavin Dance: Untitled bonus track after long period of silence after "People You Know"
 The Dandy Warhols, Earth to the Dandy Warhols: The very last second (14:46 exactly) of the last song "Mussee du Nougat" is echoed at the beginning of the first song on the album, "The World The People Together (Come On)," making the album able to be played on a loop without a gap. This is a similar technique to those used on some Pink Floyd albums.
 Daniel Amos, Mr. Buechner's Dream (disk 2): Untitled scat piece after over 10 minutes of silence on last track.
 Danny Elfman, The Nightmare Before Christmas: Original Motion Picture Soundtrack: After the final track listed is played, a track named "Untitled Hidden Track" begins to play. It is roughly 3 and a half minutes and is technically a longer version of the Overture, featuring some differing music.
 Danity Kane 
 Danity Kane: "Sleep on It" is the last track on the album, No. 15 after "Stay With Me"
 Welcome to the Dollhouse: "Ain't Going" featuring Day26 and Donnie Klang is the hidden track on the album.
 Danny!, Danny Is Dead: On the North American version of the album, an instrumental later revealed to be titled "Ebony Flower" can be found following twenty-one seconds after the last track.
 Danzig, Danzig IV: Song track number 66 (actually the 13th song) is "Invocation," a three-minute chant that ends "Many are the demon's face, And many are the forms he takes, Beware that you don't pleasure one, The demon comes to anyone".
 Darkthrone, Total Death (Disc 1): On the Peaceville reissue the last track "God Of Disturbance & Friction" is unlisted.
 Dashboard Confessional, Dusk and Summer: "Vindicated" and "Write it Out" appear in the album's pregap.
 Dash Rip Rock, Dash Rip Rock: "Mr. Rogers Goes To Hell" appears in a hidden last (15th) track of the band's eponymous 1987 debut album.
 Dave Matthews Band:
 Before These Crowded Streets: A reprise of "The Last Stop" appears after track 11, "Spoon."
 Remember Two Things: A reprise of "Seek Up" appears after track 10, "Christmas Song." Also heard are the ambient sounds of a thunderstorm and crickets.
 Big Whiskey and the GrooGrux King: At the end of the final track, You & Me, there is a brief guitar, drum, bass, and saxophone interlude known as No. 35.
 Craig David, Slicker Than Your Average: Untitled hidden track ('Say You Will'?) begins at 03:59 on track 13 'World Filled With Love'
 David Cook, David Cook: On all hard copies of the album, the hidden track "Kiss on the Neck" plays right at the 12-minute mark of the track "A Daily AntheM."
 David Crowder Band:
 All I Can Say: After the album's final track, "Thank You for Hearing Me," there are 22 5-second tracks of silence, followed by an acoustic version of Come Thou Fount.
 Can You Hear Us?: After the final track, 22 5-second tracks followed by the last third of a new version of You Alone.
 Illuminate:There is a hidden readme file on the CD which directs you to a website where the middle third of You Alone could formerly be found.
 A Collision: A URL is hidden in the liner notes, where the first third of You Alone could formerly be found.
 Days of the New, Days of the New: "Cling" lasts 6:29, with a hidden track titled "Boner Track" beginning at 8:28.
 DC Talk, Jesus Freak: "Alas, My Love" on track 13. The track is listed without a title, and begins immediately after the previous track, "Mind's Eye," reprising the intro to "So Help Me God." After a period of silence, the poem "Alas My Love" is recited. The words are printed in the CD booklet.
 Dead Cities, Red Seas & Lost Ghosts: 	"Beauties Can Die" ends at 9:17; contains a hidden track at 11:17, after a period of silence.
 Dead Poetic, New Medicines: After a short time of silence following "A Hoax to Live For" is the hidden track, "Zonshine"
 Dead Prez:
 Let's Get Free: "Propaganda" on track 44, "The Pistol" on track 45.
 Revolutionary But Gangsta: "Twenty" at track 20, "Hell Yeah (Rock Remix)" at track 21.
 Dead World, Collusion (1992): Track 10 is unlisted.
 Death from Above 1979, You're a Woman, I'm a Machine: About five seconds before the album finishes (one minute after "Sexy Results" ends), there is a short drum/piano beat.
 Death, The Sound of Perseverance: The final track, a cover of Judas Priest's song, "Painkiller," is not shown on the track listing.
 Deee-Lite, Dewdrops in the Garden: features hidden tracks after the final billed track plays.
 Def Leppard:
 Retro Active: "Miss you in a heartbeat (piano version)" appears 30 seconds after last track's end.
 High 'N' Dry: the last lyric, 'no', in "No No No" repeats infinitely on the original vinyl album release
 Hysteria: A backwards "preview" for the song "Gods of War" appears on the song "Rocket." Both songs are on Hysteria but "Rocket" plays first.
 Deftones
 Adrenaline: "Fist" after a deal of silence at the end of the album.
 Around the Fur: "Bong Hit" starts at 19:32 after the song "Mx". After the track "Bong Hit" ("Bong Hit" ends on 19:55 minute), "Damone" starts at 32:40.
 Deicide, Scars of the Crucifix: After 20 seconds after the last song 'The Pentecostal' (length 3:06) begins a hidden track on the piano.
 Del Amitri, Can You Do Me Good?: a two-minute instrumental extract from "The Septic Jubilee," one of the band's B-sides, after around 30 seconds' silence following the final track, "Just Getting By"
 Delirious?, Audio Lessonover?: "Making Art" begins after a period of silence following "Stealing Time," the final track.
 Delta Goodrem, Mistaken identity: "Nobody Listened," after "You Are My Rock." It appears only on the Australian edition of the album.
 Dem Franchize Boyz, On Top of Our Game: Contains an unlisted remix of White Tee.
 Depeche Mode:
 Construction Time Again: "Everything Counts (Reprise)," appears as a hidden track on most versions of Construction Time Again, but on some albums is tacked at the end of "And Then..." instead. It's a short version of the main single, "Everything Counts."
 Music for the Masses: "Interlude No.1: Mission Impossible," appears as a hidden track after a short silence after Pimpf.
 Violator: "Interlude No.2: Crucified" starts at 4:20 of "Enjoy the Silence." "Interlude no.3" starts at 4:18 of "Blue Dress."
 Songs of Faith and Devotion: "Interlude no.4" starts after "Get Right with Me."
 Ultra: "Junior Painkiller," an unlisted instrumental track, starts after "Insight" following a short silence.
 Sounds of the Universe: "Wrong Bonus Sample" is a hidden track in "Corrupt," and it begins at 8:17 of "Corrupt."
 Der Junge mit der Gitarre, Dagegen: "Ficken fürs Volk" begins after a period of silence following "Es ist vorbei", the final track.
 Dervish, Spirit: The song "Ochón an Gorta Mor" follows a long pause after the last track.
 Dethklok, The Dethalbum: The Deththeme is played as an extra track unlabled on the CD.
 Diamond Rio, IV: Various earlier hits mixed with sound effects in the pregap before Track 1, "Holdin'."
 Dez Dickerson, OneMan: At the end, Dez decides to forgo that traditional hidden track to actually speak to the listeners and thanks us for buying the record. He has some other goods things to say that will change your life as well.
 Bruce Dickinson, The Chemical Wedding: After the final track, "The Alchemist", there are 2 minutes of silence and a hidden reading from William Blake's epic poem Milton: "And all this Vegetable World appear’d on my left Foot, / As a bright sandal from’d immortal of precious stones & gold: / I stooped down & bound it on to walk forward thro’ Eternity."
 Diablo Swing Orchestra, The Butcher's Ballroom: Untitled intro found in the pregap
 Dido, Life for Rent: "Closer," several minutes after the final track, "See the Sun"
 Die Ärzte:
 Das ist nicht die ganze Wahrheit...: "?" after "Gute Zeit."
 13: "Lady" in the pregap of "Punk ist..."
 Geräusch: "Hände innen" in the pregap of "Als ich den Punk erfand..."
 Devil: In the pregap of the song "Füße vom Tisch" on 7:15 a voice say:"Ey du Blödmann, du hast die falsche Seite aufgelegt" ["Hey you idiot you have the wrong site launched!"]
 Jazz ist anders (bonus EP): "Nimm es wie ein Mann (a.k.a. Kurt Cobain)" in the pregap of "Wir sind die Besten"
 Jazz ist anders Economy: In the pregap of the song "Vorbei ist vorbei" on 3:00 is a parody on the 1985 song ""Was hat der Junge doch für Nerven""
 Ani DiFranco:
 Revelling/Reckoning: A pregap between the tracks "Ain't that the Way?" and "OK" segues to two tracks together.
 Educated Guess: a pregap before the track "Bubble" features Ani playing a short acoustic guitar song and vocalizing to it.
 Evolve: a pregap before the track "Oh My My" involves DiFranco and her band warming up.
 Digimon:
 High and Dry (1991): On the End of "No, No, No" on Vinyl, Kari Shouts "No" on a continuous Loop. But on the CD Version, She shouts the word for 12 times. On the 1997 Reissue, she shouts that word 50 times until fade-out.
 Digimon 2000 (1999): There is a skit between tracks 3 and 4 which consists of Sora trying to start the rusty car and saying "Come on, START YOU PIECE OF S**T! Start!" Until the car finally starts, she then sighed of relief. After track 7, another skit involving Tai attempting to knock on Matt's door and getting angry, but he gives up and says "The hell with it. Moving on". After Track 10, you can hear Kari's alarm clock ringing as she said "When is the last time I ever woke to this? She then unplugs the clock and throws it on the floor and muttered "Seriously, I need some sleep" and rolls to her sleeping position. After Track 13, Izzy, Cody and Davis playing baseball until Davis purposely break a neighbour's window. Davis yelled "Oh, shit. We gotta bail" Cody yelled "Blow out" then the trio ran. Izzy said while running "I hope this tape is still rolling. Damn it!" After the last track, you can hear Tai saying "Thank you guys so much for listening to this album. We really appreciate it. Thanks for the support".
 Home Away from Home (2002): After the final track on the CD version, Tracks 15-69 are blank tracks, Track 70 is the cover of Black Sabbath's "War Pigs" and the song ends with the track being slowed down. On the vinyl and cassette version at the end of each side, the sounds of Kari's heartbeat and breathing were recorded from an ultrasound of her chest just hours after her head surgery when she is admitted to the hospital after an incident involving nearly getting shot in the head.
 New Adventures, Old Friends (2012): After the final song, you can hear Sora walking up to her microphone quickly taps her for, but she picks it up and said "We're not recording are we?" Which leads to the hidden track of their cover of Fear's "The Mouth Won't Stop".
 Digi-Perfect (2013): After the final track "Finale", there's two minutes of dead air. Then the hidden track "Jungle Boogie" starts playing.
 Dimmu Borgir, Enthrone Darkness Triumphant : On first editions of the album track 11 is unlisted.
 Disfiguring The Goddess, Deprive: The 2006 version of the song "Deprive" starts after two minutes of silence following the final track, "Old Man".
 The Distillers, The Distillers: At the end of the track "Blackest Years" there is a one-minute gap followed by a solo performance of Young Girls by Brody Dalle on electric guitar. The song was later released on the album Sing Sing Death House with some different lyrics and played by the whole band.
 Disturbed, Asylum: After track 12, track 13 starts with 1:35 of silence before the song Ishfwilf starts playing.
 The Divine Comedy, Promenade: Short film soundbite at the end of the album --- Ode to the man
 Dir en grey, Gauze: Track 12, Akuro no Oka, contains a large part of track 13, Gauze -Mode of Eve-, which lasts about 1:09 in its entirety.
 Alesha Dixon, The Alesha Show: Contains a hidden track "Mystery" as the very last song.
 DJ Encore, Unique: contains the hidden track "Liquid Sky" after the track "Out there" and a gap.
 DJ Sammy, Heaven (UK release): A hidden track called "California Dreamin'" starts playing after track 11, "Heaven (Yanou's Candlelight Mix)" finishes at 4:02.
 DMX, The Great Depression: "A Minute For Your Son" contains 3 hidden tracks immediately after the song ends. Though unlisted they're known as "Next Out The Kennel" which features verses from 4 rappers associated with Bloodline Records, "Problem Child" which features Drag-On & Mysonne and "Usual Suspects 2" with Mic Geronimo & Big Stan.
 Fefe Dobson, Fefe Dobson: "Rainbow" at the end of the album
 Dog Fashion Disco:
 Erotic Massage: Tracks 13-26 contain silence, Track 27 is a hidden track.
 Committed to a Bright Future: A cover of the song "Grease," theme song to the film Grease. On early US editions, track 14, on European editions, track 15 (after a bonus track, a rerecording of "China White" from Erotic Massage), and on newer editions, hidden in the pregap before "Love Song for a Witch," the first track.
 Dogs of Peace, Speak: The last song is followed by an extended silence, and then a brief snippet of staccato guitar noises.
 Don Henley, Actual Miles: Henley's Greatest Hits: A cover of Leonard Cohen's song "Everybody Knows" at the end of the CD.
 Donkey Kong Country, DK Jamz: "Level cleared" if you skip to Track 100
 Dope, LIFE: Features an unlisted track, "You're Full of Shit" on track 14.
 Doubledrive: The band's debut album 1000 Yard Stare featured a cover of Wall of Voodoo's "Mexican Radio" as the album's 87 track (tracks 12-86 were all two-five seconds of silence a piece).
 Downhere:
 Downhere: Features a hidden track "Rock Stars Need Money" as track 12. You have to fast-forward to 3:00. That's when it starts.
 So Much for Substitutes: Features the hidden track 'Home' at 6:45 of the song Last Night's Day Dream.
 Dr. Dre:
 The Chronic: Features an unlisted track, "Bitches Ain't Shit" on track 16. This track is listed on the 2001 reissue.
 Dr. Dre 2001: Right after the final song "The Message," there is a hidden outro where Tommy Chong begins to speak.
 Dream Theater:
 When Dream and Day Unite Demos 1987–1989: The second disc contains an unlisted and untitled bonus track at the end of the CD.
 Images and Words Demos 1989–1991: The second disc contains an unlisted tenth track, "Oliver's Twist," which is an early instrumental version of Pull Me Under.
 Octavarium: Contains a series of interludes through the album.
 Dream Theater: After Illumination Theory, there's a 30-second gap of silence, followed by an untitled instrumental.
 The Dresden Dolls, The Dresden Dolls: After "Truce," at the very end of an album, a woman says, "Amanda, you're telling me a fairy tale."
 dredg, Leitmotif: After the last track of the album, "Movement V: 90 Hour Sleep" (2:23), a 7-minute gap separates the song from an 11-minute hidden track (starts at 9:24, ends at 20:21). The whole track has an inferior quality in comparison to all others from the album and is entirely an improvisation, near the end of the hidden track, lead singer Gavin Hayes can be heard singing the lyrics to "Penguins in the Desert," from the same album.
 Drop Dead, Gorgeous, In Vogue: There is a grindcore song after the final track.
 Drottnar, Spiritual Battle: Track 8 is untitled and hidden.
 Hilary Duff, Most Wanted: "I Am (Remix 2005)," a remix of a song from her second album, can only be found on the regular version of the album, in America.
 Duffle Band, Playing With Myself: There are two bonus tracks included after the 13th listed song on the band's 2005 self-released album. Track 14, "Interviewing Myself," is a fake interview in which the band's only member conducts a humorous interview with himself, along with distorted electric guitar noise silently playing on the left side of the stereo mix. Track 15, "I Found God," is a short, sarcastic, folky, punk tune about finding god/jesus/religion played on an out of tune acoustic guitar.
 Dune, Dune: The last track "...In the End" is credited with a length of 8:05, but its actual runtime is 10:58. A distorted recording of Tchaikovsky Piano Concerto No. 1, 2nd Movement can be heard in the last 55 seconds, long after the actual track has faded out into silence.
 Dunkel:heit, Obey: There are nine untitled hidden tracks. These tracks are movie samples.
 Dystopia: 
 Human=Garbage: Untitled track at 25:04 at the end of Sleep, the last track on the album.
 The Aftermath: Cover of "Cosmetic Plague" by Rudimentary Peni at 29:34 at the end of Diary of a Battered Child, the last track on the album.
 Dødheimsgard:
 Kronet Til Konge: On some editions tracks "Intro" and "Outro" are unlisted on the back cover.
 666 International: Untitled track number 66 (tracks 10-65 have no audio content).

See also
 List of backmasked messages
 List of albums with tracks hidden in the pregap

References 

D